Momčilo "Gabbo" Gavrić (August 4, 1938 – March 13, 2010) was a Yugoslavian-born football player.

Club career
Born in Sinj, Croatia, Gavric aspired to play professional soccer and played in his hometown club NK Junak Sinj. In 1959, he moved to Belgrade, then Yugoslav capital, and began playing with Yugoslav First League side OFK Beograd. He had call-ups to the national team, but only ended up playing for the B national team. He left Yugoslavia in 1967 and moved to the United States. In 1967, he signed with the Oakland Clippers of the North American Soccer League.  Gavrić spent two seasons with the Clippers and won the 1967 championship with them. He was also an NFL placekicker for the San Francisco 49ers in 1969. In 1971, he moved to the Dallas Tornado, then on to the San Jose Earthquakes from 1974 to 1978. In 1975, Gabbo Gavrić was the co-MVP of the NASL indoor tournament and named to the All-tournament team. He was a player and coach at San Jose until 1976, and he continued to coach through 1978.

Death
Gavric died on March 13, 2010, of complications from Parkinson's disease.

Clubs
NK Junak Sinj 1957–59
OFK Belgrade 1959–67
Oakland Clippers 1967–69
San Francisco 49ers 1969
Portland Loggers 1969
Dallas Tornado 1971
San Jose Earthquakes 1974–78

References

External links
 NFL career statistics
 NASL career stats
 Gavric remembered

1938 births
2010 deaths
People from Sinj
Association football defenders
American people of Serbian descent
Yugoslav footballers
NK Junak Sinj players
OFK Beograd players
Oakland Clippers players
Dallas Tornado players
San Jose Earthquakes (1974–1988) players
Yugoslav First League players
North American Soccer League (1968–1984) players
North American Soccer League (1968–1984) indoor players
Yugoslav expatriate footballers
Expatriate soccer players in the United States
Yugoslav expatriate sportspeople in the United States
Croatian players of American football
American football placekickers
San Francisco 49ers players
Portland Loggers players
Yugoslav football managers
North American Soccer League (1968–1984) coaches
San Jose Earthquakes (1974–1988) coaches
Footballers who switched code
Neurological disease deaths in California
Deaths from Parkinson's disease